Hudson Line refers to the following rail lines, all originally part of the Hudson River Railroad:
Hudson Line (Metro-North), a commuter line from New York City north to Poughkeepsie
Hudson Subdivision a line from Poughkeepsie north to Rensselaer, owned by CSX and leased by Amtrak
West Side Line in New York City, now owned by Amtrak from New York Penn Station north to Spuyten Duyvil
High Line, the abandoned West Side Line south of Penn Station, now an elevated park

See also 
 Vaudreuil–Hudson line out of Montreal